The Old Church is a church in Bădăcin, Romania, built in 1705.

References

External links
 Bădăcin, Biserica veche
 Biserica "Schimbarea la Față"

Historic monuments in Sălaj County
Churches completed in 1705
Wooden churches in Sălaj County
1705 establishments in the Habsburg monarchy